The Judgment of Paris is a 1528 painting by the German artist Lucas Cranach the Elder. It depicts the myth of Paris, Prince of Troy, selecting the fairest goddess from among Minerva, Juno, and Venus. Cranach likely based his depiction on medieval poetry or romances. The painting is now in the Metropolitan Museum of Art, New York.

References
 Kathryn Calley Galitz. The Metropolitan Museum of Art: Masterpiece Paintings. New York, 2016, p. 276, no. 181, ill. pp. 185, 276.
 Maryan W. Ainsworth in Maryan W. Ainsworth and Joshua P. Waterman. German Paintings in The Metropolitan Museum of Art, 1350–1600. New Haven, 2013, pp. 5, 54–58, 286–87.
 Helmut Nickel. "'The Judgment of Paris' by Lucas Cranach the Elder: Nature, Allegory, and Alchemy." Metropolitan Museum Journal 16 (1981), pp. 117–29.
 Max J. Friedländer and Jakob Rosenberg. The Paintings of Lucas Cranach. rev. ed. Ithaca, N.Y., 1978, p. 120, no. 254.

Notes

1500s paintings
Paintings by Lucas Cranach the Elder
1528 paintings
Greek goddesses in art
Nude art
Paintings depicting Greek myths
Paintings of Venus
Paintings of Minerva
1520s paintings
Paintings in the collection of the Metropolitan Museum of Art